This list of tallest buildings in Memphis ranks completed buildings by height in the U.S. city of Memphis, Tennessee, the 28th largest city in the United States. The tallest building is the 100 North Main building at 430 ft (131m), built in 1965. The Sterick Building, 364 ft (111m) was the tallest building in the Southern United States when built in 1930, holding that title until 1932 when surpassed by the Louisiana State Capitol in Baton Rouge. The first skyscraper built in Memphis was the Dr. D.T. Porter Building, 131 ft (40m), in 1895. The tallest man-made structure in the city is the 1003 ft (305.7m) Edwin L. Nass Tower 1, a guyed steel TV transmitting tower located at 5317 Crestview Road in northeast Memphis.

Unlike many other downtowns in the Sun Belt, Memphis did not experience the high-rise building booms of the late 1980s or early 2000s. Only four buildings over 100m have been built in downtown Memphis since World War II: 100 North Main, Raymond James Tower, One Commerce Square, and First Tennessee Bank Building. This has resulted in a smaller, more historic skyline compared to other nearby cities of similar age and population (compare to Atlanta, Nashville, Dallas/Fort Worth, or St. Louis). Three of the tallest in the city are located in the upscale neighborhood of East Memphis: the Clark Tower, the Hilton Memphis, and the White Station Tower.

As of 2018 the long-delayed One Beale Street project getting a completely revised plan of 4 separate components: hotel, residential, office and garage. The hotel component will be built first, and received a ground-breaking date for January 2019. 
Also, a major renovation of the cities' tallest tower—100 North Main St—which currently sits vacant, was planned and the same owner/developer announced plans for a 26-story Loews brand highrise hotel. This will be built near city hall and the convention center downtown. In addition, there may be a 2nd tower built for either office or residential mixed-use.

With the COVID-19 pandemic putting a halt to many projects worldwide in early 2020, some of Memphis' development projects were delayed and tabled, as-a-result. The Memphis Convention Center renovation, rebranded as Memphis Renasant Convention Center will open in early 2021, and the One Beale St project has been underway since late 2018 and progressing, after years of delays. The Pinch District has skyscraper proposals on the table, and the new development formerly known as "Union Row," has been renamed and rebranded as "The Walk on Union."



Tallest buildings

Tallest future buildings

Under Construction
Buildings that are currently construction in Memphis and expected to rise above  include:

Approved
Buildings that are approved for construction in Memphis and expected to rise above  include:

Timeline of tallest buildings
This lists buildings that once held the title of tallest building in Memphis.

References

 
Memphis
Tallest in Memphis